Harry Adam Groshek (March 27, 1907 – January 8, 1978) was a Wisconsin politician and a member of the prominent Wisconsin Groshek family.

He is most notable for serving as the Wisconsin Superintendent of Public Parks and Recreation from 1940 to 1949, and the Wisconsin Secretary of Education from 1949 until 1961 when he retired. He was married to Esther Louise Groshek.

Notes

1907 births
1975 deaths
People from Neenah, Wisconsin
Lawrence University alumni
University of Wisconsin–Madison alumni
Educators from Wisconsin
Superintendents of Public Instruction of Wisconsin
People from Sun City, Arizona